Shaw is an unincorporated community in Neosho County, Kansas, United States.

History
Shaw was founded in 1885. Throughout the twentieth century the town was served by the Atchison, Topeka and Santa Fe Railroad.

References

Further reading

External links
 Neosho County maps: Current, Historic, KDOT

Unincorporated communities in Neosho County, Kansas
Unincorporated communities in Kansas